Orcas (or killer whales) are large, powerful apex predators. In the wild, there have been no reliably verified fatal attacks on humans. In captivity, there have been several non-fatal and four fatal attacks on humans since the 1970s. Experts are divided as to whether the injuries and deaths were accidental or deliberate attempts to cause harm.

Incidents with wild orcas 
There are a few recorded cases of wild orcas threatening humans. However, there have been no reliably verified fatalities.

1910s 
 In the early 1910s, the Terra Nova Expedition recorded that orcas had attempted to tip ice floes on which an expedition photographer and a sled dog team were standing.

1950s 
 There are anecdotal reports that, circa 1955, an Inuit man fell prey to an orca entrapped in ice in Grand Suttie Bay (Foxe Basin, Canada). A pod of orcas (likely 10-12 animals) was entrapped in a polynya, and a young man visited the site in spite of advice from elders to wait until the ice was strong enough. Two Inuit elders stated to a research team that one of the animals chased the young man, broke the ice under him, then killed and ate him. However, the researchers weren't able to directly confirm the predation of man, as one of the elders clearly stated that he hadn't witnessed the event himself while the other didn't clarify whether he had. As the ice thickened, two to three whales were taken by Inuit hunters, and three more were harpooned but tore the lines (made of seal skin). The rest of the pod likely died of starvation.

 In 1958, an orca attacked the fishing boat Tiger Shark after being struck with a harpoon off the coast of Long Island. The whale was able to get free and chased the vessel for some time. At one instance he lifted the boat "clear out of the water".

1960s 
 In 1962 off Bellingham a male orca attacked a boat towing a female on a rope, that had been live-captured for an oceanarium. The male arrived on the scene twenty minutes after the capture, probably prompted by the distress calls of the female.

1970s 

Dougal Robertson and his family of five escaped to an inflatable life raft and a dinghy.
 On September 9, 1972, Californian surfer Hans Kretschmer reported being bitten by a killer whale at Point Sur; most maintain that this remains the only fairly well-documented instance of a wild orca biting a human. His wounds required 100 stitches.
 On March 9, 1976 the italian racing yacht Guia III was rammed and sunk by an orca off the coast of Brazil. The vessel was hit once by an individual out a pod of four to five orcas. The crew of six successfully escaped to a liferaft. The whales showed no reaction to the escaping humans a few meters from them.

1980s 

 In 1989 American researcher Bernd Würsig published an article about him having been attacked by a killer whale on a beach of Valdes Peninsula. A single individual, possibly as big as 9 metres (30 ft), beached towards him while he was watching sea lions about 200 metres (650 ft) from him in hope to take a photograph of a killer whale hunt. Dr Würsig ran up the beach after the animal missed him by about 1 metre. He speculated that the whale might have mistaken him for a pinniped.

2000s 
 In August 2005, while swimming in four feet of water in Helm Bay, near Ketchikan, Alaska, a 12-year-old boy named Ellis Miller was bumped in the shoulder by a  transient killer whale. The boy was not bitten or injured in any way. The bay is frequented by harbor seals, and it is possible that the whale misidentified him as prey.

2010s 
 During the filming of the third episode of the BBC documentary Frozen Planet (2011), a group of orcas were filmed trying to swamp the film crew's  zodiac boat with waves as they were filming. The crew had earlier taped the group hunting seals in the same fashion. It was not mentioned if any of the crew were hurt in the encounter. The crew described the orcas as being very tolerant of the film makers' presence. Over the course of 14 days they filmed over 20 different attacks on seals, many of which the film series producer Vanessa Berlowitz described as training exercises for the young calves in the group.
 On February 10, 2014, a free diver in Horahora Estuary near Whangarei, New Zealand, was pulled down for over 40 seconds by a killer whale that grabbed a bag containing crayfish and urchins, which was attached to his arm by a rope. The rope eventually came free. He then undid his weight belt and returned to the surface. He had lost all feeling in his arm and could no longer swim, but his cousin was nearby and helped him float to some rocks where the feeling in his arm returned.

2020s
 From July to October 2020 there were at least forty reliable reports of orcas attacking boats off the Atlantic coast of Spain and Portugal, unusual and unprecedented behaviour. The nudging, biting and ramming attacks, on medium-size sailing boats sailing at moderate speed, concentrated on the rudder, with some impacts on the hull. A small group of orcas are believed to be responsible, with three juveniles which have been named black Gladis, white Gladis and grey Gladis, identified as present in most attacks. No people were injured. The Portuguese coastguard banned small sailing vessels from a region where several incidents had been reported. It is thought that the behaviour is playful, rather than aggressive or vengeful.

Captive orca attacks 
There have been attacks on humans by captive killer whales, some fatal. So far, four fatalities have been recorded, three of which were caused by the same Orca: Tilikum.

1960s 
 In 1968, the young female orca, Lupa, of the New York Aquarium, chased her trainers out of the tank, snapping her jaws threateningly. Trainers were cleaning the tank at the time of the incident.
 In 1969, adult female orca Kianu pinned trainer William Allen to the side of her tank, and had to be pushed off him with a pole by an assistant. In another incident with the same trainer, she threw him off her back, and chased him out of the pool, her mouth open.

1970s 
 In 1970, Cuddles, a female orca (originally incorrectly identified as a male) who resided in both Dudley Zoo and Flamingo Park (now Flamingo Land) in England, became so aggressive towards her trainers at Flamingo Park, having attacked them twice, that her keepers were forced to clean her pool from the safety of a shark cage. 
 On April 20, 1971, SeaWorld secretary Annette Eckis was talked into riding the park's main attraction, a 10-year-old female orca named Shamu (the original by that name), at the park in San Diego, California, as a publicity stunt. As the ride was coming to an end, Eckis was suddenly thrown off the orca's back. The orca seized the woman by her leg and began pushing her through the water. Trainers on the side of the tank grabbed the young woman and attempted to pull her out of the water, but the cetacean again grabbed the woman's leg and refused to let go. Shamu's jaws had to be pried apart with a pole in order to free her. Eckis was carried away on a stretcher and required 25 stitches to close the wounds she suffered. Eckis later sued SeaWorld, but a monetary award was overturned on appeal. 
 In 1971, young female orca Cuddles attacked the Dudley Zoo's director, Donald Robinson, while being fed, dragging him to the bottom of the pool. He sustained head and neck injuries.
 In 1971, trainer Chris Christiansen received 7 stitches in his cheek after young male orca Hugo closed his mouth on Christiansen's head.
 In 1972, trainer Roy Lock was hospitalized with a broken nose after Dudley Zoo's orca Cuddles put too much force into a trick in which she "kissed" her trainer.
 During the summer of 1972, two trainers at Seven Seas Marine Life Park were bitten on the head by the park's orca Nootka. Trainer Larry Lawrence sustained minor injuries on his scalp, while trainer Bob Peek sustained a more serious laceration over his eye.
 In the early 1970s, a Marine World/Africa USA trainer, Jeff Pulaski, while riding a young female orca named Kianu during performances, was thrown off and chased out of the tank.
 At the same park, also in the early 1970s, an unidentified Marine World trainer was seized by the young male Orky II and held at the bottom of the tank until the man nearly lost consciousness.
 In the early 1970s, trainer Manny Velasco recalls both Hugo and Lolita of the Miami Seaquarium becoming aggressive, lunging and snapping at the trainers standing on the central work-island, ending the training session for the day.
 In the early 1970s, during a water work session Hugo refused to allow trainer Chip Kirk to get out of the water, Kirk explained to a journalist from the Palm Beach Post. Hugo bit him on the arm badly enough to leave a scar, which Kirk showed to the reporter.
 In the early 1970s, Hugo grabbed trainer Bob Pulaski by the wetsuit and began thrashing him. Pulaski struggled, but it only made things worse. Hugo's tank-mate Lolita then joined in and began a tug-of-war with Hugo. Pulaski managed to free himself from the tangled wetsuit and get to safety. Pulaski did not mention if he sustained any injuries.
 In the early 1970s, director of training at Sea-Arama Marineworld Ken Beggs claimed that one of the park's orcas, a young male named Mamuk, attempted to bite his torso.
 In the early 1970s, young female killer whale Nootka became aggressive towards a visiting reporter at Seven Seas Marine Life Park, beaching herself in an attempt to lunge at him. She had to be returned to her pool with a crane.
 In the early 1970s, a trainer at Seven Seas Marine Life Park, Larry Lawrence, was raked by Nootka. He had to receive 145 stitches in his left leg. 
 On May 2, 1978, another Marineland of the Pacific trainer, 27-year-old Jill Stratton, was nearly drowned when the 10-year-old Orky II suddenly grabbed her and dragged her to the bottom of the tank, holding her there for nearly four minutes.
 On May 22nd, 1978, SeaWorld trainer Greg Williams was bitten on the legs by the park's killer whale Winston. He was hospitalized with minor injuries.
 In the 1970s, a Marine World California trainer, Dave Worcester, was dragged to the bottom of the tank by the park's young male orca Nepo.
 In the 1970s, a Vancouver Aquarium trainer, Doug Pemberton, recalls that, "Skana once showed her dislike by dragging a trainer around the pool. Her teeth sank into his wetsuit but missed his leg." Pemberton described both young female Skana and her male companion Hyak II as "moody" but stated that Skana was the dominant animal in the pool. "She is capable of changing moods in minutes".

1980s 
 On February 23, 1984, a 7-year-old female orca by the name of Kandu V grabbed a SeaWorld California trainer, Joanne Hay, and pinned her against a tank wall during a performance. Hay was only released after another trainer jammed a fist into the whale's blowhole.
 In November 1986, trainer Mark Beeler was held against a wall by Kandu V during a live performance.
 In 1986, an unidentified Marineland of Canada trainer was taken to the hospital after he fell off the park's male killer whale, Kandu 7, and was dragged by his leg around the pool during a trick.
 In 1986, a 4-year-old female orca, Nootka V, hit an unidentified MarineLand, Ontario trainer in the head with her pectoral fin during a show. According to a former trainer, the whale had a habit of leaping out of the water in an attempt to strike trainers by the pool in the chest.
 On March 4, 1987, 20-year-old SeaWorld San Diego trainer Jonathan Smith was grabbed by one of the park's  killer whales. The orca dragged the trainer to the bottom of the tank, then carried him bleeding all the way back to the surface and then spat him out. Smith waved to the crowd when a second orca slammed into him. He continued to pretend he was unhurt as the whales repeatedly dragged him to the bottom of the stadium pool. Smith was cut all around his torso, had a ruptured kidney and a six-inch laceration of his liver, yet he managed to escape the pool with his life. Later reports indicate that the whales involved in the attack had been 10-year-old female Kenau and 9-year-old female Kandu V.
 On June 15, 1987, a 29-year-old SeaWorld San Diego trainer, Joanne Webber, suffered a fractured neck when Kandu V landed on top of her and pushed her to the bottom of the pool during a training session. Webber had five years of experience working with orcas.
 On November 21, 1987, trainer John Sillick was riding on the back of a female orca when Orky II, a five-ton male, jumped and landed upon him. Sillick had to have multiple surgeries; his back, hips, pelvis, ribs, and legs were severely fractured. The incident led to the firing of SeaWorld's president and 3 other employees. In an interview, he said, "I'm learning to walk again."
 On April 1, 1989, Nootka IV of Sealand of the Pacific in Victoria, British Columbia, pulled her trainer, Henriette Huber, into the whale tank after the 6-year-old female bit down while the trainer had her hand in the mouth of the orca in order to scratch its tongue. Huber needed several stitches in order to close her wounds.
 Also in 1989, Nootka IV of Sealand of the Pacific grabbed a tourist's camera that was accidentally dropped into the whale's tank. Head trainer Steve Huxter attempted to retrieve the camera but was pulled into the pool when the orca refused to give up its new toy. The orca grabbed the trainer's leg, but Huxter was pulled to safety by fellow trainer Eric Walters.

1990s 
 On February 20, 1991, at Sealand of the Pacific in Victoria, British Columbia, a young part-time trainer named Keltie Byrne fell into the tank. The large male orca Tilikum rushed over and grabbed her foot and pulled her into the water (according to eyewitness accounts in the movie Blackfish). Two smaller female orcas (Haida II, Nootka IV) were also in the tank. The trainer was dragged into the water and was pushed and thrown around the pool.  All three animals barred her escape, continuously blocking her path and dragging her back into the center of the tank. It was several hours before Byrne's body could be recovered. Sealand of the Pacific closed soon after the incident and sold all of their orcas to the SeaWorld franchise; Haida II and her calf Kyuquot (who was born after the incident) were both moved to SeaWorld Texas. Haida II died in 2001. Nootka IV and Tilikum were both transferred to the SeaWorld in Florida. Nootka IV died in 1994 and Tilikum in 2017. Tilikum was directly responsible for another trainer's death in 2010. Haida II and Nootka IV were both impregnated by Tilikum at the time of the incident.
 In 1993, 17-year-old female Kasatka tried to bite an unidentified SeaWorld California trainer.
 On June 12, 1999, 23-year-old Kasatka grabbed her trainer Ken Peters by the leg and attempted to throw him from the pool during a public show at SeaWorld San Diego.
 On July 5, 1999, at SeaWorld Orlando Florida, a South Carolina man by the name of Daniel Dukes was found nude and in one of the orca tanks draped across the back of the park's largest male orca, Tilikum. An autopsy revealed that the man died of drowning. Dukes was covered in bruises, abrasions, bite marks consistent with orca bites, and his scrotum had been ripped open, indicating that Tilikum had clear contact with the victim, but whether or not Tilikum actually caused the man's death was not determined Dukes had apparently hidden himself in the park until after closing, evaded security, and then entered the orca's tank. Dukes had been reported by Seaworld staff to have "dived" with other sea mammals. The autopsy found no drugs in his system. No SeaWorld admission ticket was found, but staff made it well known that this man did not fall into Tilikum's tank. He had to hop a  Plexiglas barrier and several guardrail fences and descend the steps into the  tank.

2000s 
 On July 8, 2002, Tamarie Tollison, a 28-year-old trainer, was hospitalized for a compound fracture of the forearm as well as several lesser injuries after an incident occurred in Shamu Stadium at SeaWorld San Diego. She was working poolside with two of the park's orcas, Orkid and Splash. "She was playing with the whales, talking to them… the next thing we know, as it appears from the video, she was pulled into the water," said SeaWorld spokesperson Darla Davis. Visitor video shows that the trainer was pulled in by her foot after the female Orkid grabbed it during the session. Both Orkid and Splash continually pulled the trainer under as she screamed for help. A fellow trainer made the decision to take the chain off the gate of an adjoining pool to imply to Orkid and Splash that Kasatka⁠ ⁠— a more dominant female⁠ ⁠— was coming in, after which Orkid, who was holding Tamarie at the time, then let the trainer go and she was able to escape. Park officials stated that the trainer exited the pool without assistance and was taken to a local hospital, where a pin was needed to reset her fractured arm.
 In late July 2004, during a show at the SeaWorld park in San Antonio, Texas, a male orca named Kyuquot (nickname Ky) repeatedly jumped on top of his trainer, Steve Aibel, forcing him underwater and barring the trainer from escaping the water. After several minutes, the trainer was able to calm the animal, and he exited the pool unhurt. "Veterinarians believe the whale... felt threatened by the trainer, perhaps a result of the effects of adolescent hormones."
 On April 4, 2005, SeaWorld Florida trainer Sam Davis was repeatedly "bumped" by Taku, an 11-year-old male orca. The show continued uninterrupted, but the trainer was later taken to Sand Lake Hospital for unspecified minor injuries and released the same day. According to an eyewitness, "The trainer and Taku were about to slide on the slide out at the end of the show when Taku completely stopped and started bumping the trainer. The male trainer finally swam out of the tank. I knew something was wrong because none of the whales except Kalina wanted to perform. Then they finally got Taku out to splash people at the end of the show, when this incident took place."
 On November 15, 2006, a SeaWorld California trainer was injured when the park's 18-year-old female orca, Orkid, grabbed veteran trainer Brian Rokeach by the foot and pulled him to the bottom of the tank, refusing to release him for an extended period of time. Orkid released Rokeach only after heeding fellow trainer Kenneth Peters' repeated attempts to call the animal's attention back to the stage. Rokeach suffered a torn ligament in his ankle but was not taken to the hospital. In response to the incident, SeaWorld increased the number of trainers who must be available during performances and in-water-training to five staff members. This was ineffective, as two weeks later, trainer Kenneth Peters was involved in a similar incident (below) with a different orca.
 On November 29, 2006, Kasatka, one of SeaWorld San Diego's seven orcas, grabbed her trainer, Ken Peters, by the foot and dragged him to the bottom of the tank several times during an evening show at Shamu Stadium. The senior trainer escaped after nine minutes, when Kasatka released him. The orca then followed Peters, proceeding over a netted barrier towards Peters. This was the second documented incident of Kasatka attacking Peters and was the third most widely reported of all the SeaWorld incidents.
 On October 6, 2007, at the Loro Parque, a 29-year-old German trainer, Claudia Vollhardt, who had worked at the park since 2003, was hospitalized after she was injured during a training session with the male orca Tekoa. The Canarias 7 newspaper says the incident happened at the pre-show warm-up on Saturday, when the orca crashed into the trainer, injuring her right lung and breaking her forearm in two places. OME News wrote that it was a male orca that hit the trainer, dragged her down after the impact and dragged her back up to the surface. She was rescued by two colleagues after the incident. The trainer was in a stable condition after surgery. Vollhardt trained mostly with 6-year-old male Tekoa, and some news reports referred to him as the orca involved in this incident.
 On September 9, 2008, during a show at Marineland Antibes in France, a 26-year-old female orca named Freya began acting oddly in the middle of the show, then pulled an unidentified trainer under the water. The trainer resurfaced after a few seconds only for Freya to return and begin jumping on top of the man. After landing on top of her trainer twice, she began to push him through and under the water. The trainer tried to regain control of the situation by climbing on the orca's back but was thrown off. The trainer eventually managed to get to the edge of the pool and climb out, seemingly unhurt.
 In the spring of 2009, a 5-year-old female orca named Skyla turned on an unidentified trainer while performing in one of Loro Parque Tenerife's daily shows. Skyla started pushing her trainer through the water and up against the sides of the pool. "Water work" has been suspended with her, and only senior trainers are allowed to work with her now.
 On December 24, 2009, 29-year-old Alexis Martínez died during a rehearsal for a Christmas Day show at Loro Parque in Spain. The 14-year-old male orca Keto, who was born at SeaWorld Orlando Florida, rammed Martínez in the chest, rendering him unconscious. Martínez drowned before fellow trainers could rescue him. The park repeatedly asserted that this was not an attack but an unfortunate accident caused by roughhousing; however, the park also described Keto as "not... (being) completely predictable." The subsequent autopsy report revealed that Alexis died due to the serious injuries he sustained from the orca attack, including multiple compression fractures and tears to his vital organs with the bite marks all over his body. Martínez was considered one of the most experienced trainers in Loro Parque, having worked at the park since 2004.

2010s 

 On February 24, 2010, the large Icelandic bull orca Tilikum killed Dawn Brancheau, an experienced trainer, at the end of a "Dine with Shamu" show at SeaWorld Orlando. SeaWorld officials stated that Tilikum grabbed Brancheau by her ponytail and pulled her into the water, drowning her. Eyewitness trainers and audience members, however, stated that Tilikum dragged Brancheau into the water by her forearm, near the end of the show. The autopsy determined that the trainer died of "multiple traumatic injuries and drowning". Tilikum was involved in two previous fatalities. He died in 2017, having been the largest breeding male in captivity.
 In July 2012, Shouka, a female orca on a breeding loan to Six Flags Discovery Kingdom from Marineland France, lunged out of the water during a show, throwing her trainer several feet backwards. She repeatedly lunged out of the water attempting to reach her trainer. The whole incident was caught on video by a patron sitting in the audience. Critics of marine parks have blamed Shouka's lack of companionship as the source of her aggression, as she did at one time have a companion bottlenose dolphin named Merlin who was subsequently moved to another area of the park. Shouka was transferred to Sea World San Diego soon after this incident.

Incidents involving unidentified captive orcas 
 In the mid-1970s, Karen Pryor reports, "I have since heard... of at least one killer whale [that] launched an unprovoked attack on a favorite trainer, in normal circumstances, savaged him very badly, and nearly killed him."
 On August 12, 1984, two unidentified killer whales grabbed trainer Bud Krames by the legs and pinned him against a wall during a performance. Krames, a trainer at SeaWorld California, suffered minor injuries.
 In 1987, several of San Diego's newspapers reported on a "white paper" disclosure of at least 14 different injuries of varying severity suffered by the trainers of SeaWorld California while working with orcas within a five-month period in 1987. Only a few of the incidents ever made it into the news.
 On September 28, 1987, an unidentified killer whale bit trainer Mark McHugh on the hand during training.
 On September 30, 1987, during a performance, a 24-year-old SeaWorld San Diego trainer named Chris Barlow was rammed in the stomach by an unidentified orca. Barlow was hospitalized with minor injuries.

Notable orcas involved in incidents 
While Tilikum has perhaps the most infamous reputation of all captive orcas, there have been several other orcas that have harmed people whether intentionally or unintentionally on more than one occasion.
 Tilikum: responsible for 2 documented attacks and 1 unwitnessed incident, all 3 of which resulted in the death of a person.
 Nootka IV: responsible for 3 documented attacks, 1 of which resulted in the death of a trainer.
 Haida II: responsible for 1 documented attack that resulted in the death of a trainer.
 Kandu V: responsible for 5 documented attacks. Kandu V was also known for being aggressive towards her tank-mates, particularly with Corky II.
 Kasatka: responsible for 3 documented attacks, two of which were toward trainer Ken Peters. This may have been a direct result of her current theme park's removal of her calf from her and to another park.
 Hugo: responsible for 3 documented attacks and 1 incident in which he bit his trainers head during a trick. Anthony Toran Administrative Director for the Seaquarium', also said Hugo made "what appeared to be direct efforts to harm human performers."
 Orky II: responsible for 2 documented attacks and 1 incident in which he crushed a trainer because of blindness in one eye that was not revealed to his trainers.
 Orkid: responsible for 2 documented attacks and 1 incident that was, most likely, an accident but resulted in a trip to the hospital with minor injuries.
 Cuddles: responsible for 2 documented attacks.
 Winston/Ramu: responsible for at least 2 attacks and 1 near miss according to his former trainer Doug Cartlidge.
 Keto: responsible for 1 documented attack that resulted in the death of a trainer.

See also 
 Orca, a 1977 dramatic film
 Blackfish, a 2013 documentary
 Captive killer whales
 Incidents at SeaWorld parks

References 

Orcas
Cetacean attacks